Robert Allen Stein is a former American football linebacker. He played collegiately for the University of Minnesota as a defensive end and place kicker.  He was a two-time All-American, Academic All-American, and 3-time Academic All-Big Ten player.

He began his professional career in 1969 with the American Football League's Kansas City Chiefs, with whom he won the fourth and final AFL-NFL World Championship Game after the 1969 pro football season. Speaking of that game, he said: "I will always remember guys like Jerry Mays, Johnny Robinson, Budde, Tyrer, Arbanas, Buck, Bobby Bell, etc. nearly crying in our locker room before Super Bowl IV when Hank Stram surprised us with the AFL patch on our jerseys.  After 10 years of the AFL being called an inferior league, winning that Super Bowl was particularly meaningful."

Stein, at 21, was the youngest player to play in the Super Bowl for a decade.  He graduated in the top 10% of the University of Missouri – Kansas City Law School, attending full-time while playing for the Chiefs. He was offered scholarships to Harvard, Michigan, and Stanford law schools after college.  He was the University of Minnesota Rhodes Scholarship nominee, and later co-founded the Gopher football booster group, the Goal Line Club, in 1980.

Stein was the first president and CEO of the NBA's Minnesota Timberwolves, a position he held until 1995.  As Senior Executive for the expansion franchise and new Target Center Arena, Stein helped create over 850 new jobs.  The Wolves established and still hold the all-time NBA attendance record and sold out all suites during his tenure.  Stein directed planning, design, public approvals, and financing for the 900,000 sq ft Target Center and managed the $240 million+ refinance of Target Center Arena, the Timberwolves and the owners' health clubs.  Before leading the Timberwolves organization, he had been a 10-year sports attorney-agent in football, basketball, and hockey.

Stein was President of the Timberwolves Foundation, which contributed over 100,000 event tickets for schools/non-profits and $1.5 million+ for at-risk youth in 6 NBA seasons. He was appointed to the Minnesota Boxing Commission in December 2007 by Governor Tim Pawlenty.

Stein has been inducted into the University of Minnesota Sports Hall of Fame, The Jewish Sports Hall of Fame, the St. Louis Park (MN) Athletic Hall of Fame, and the University of Minnesota Sports Hall of Fame.  He is also in the HOF of Beta Theta Pi fraternity. He is a member of the Missouri Sports Hall of Fame Honor Roll of World Champions for the 1969 Chiefs team.

Stein has volunteered on community boards, including Bank of America MN Advisory, Children's Cancer Research Fund, Taste of NFL/Hunger Related Events, Jacob Wetterling Foundation, Minnesota Zoo, Minneapolis Downtown Council, Hennepin County Sheriff's Advisory Board and FBI Citizen's Academy.

In 2009, Stein conceived and began the first class action lawsuit on behalf of retired NFL players against the NFL.  His case, Dryer v. NFL, fought for fair payment for the NFL's use of player identities, including in NFL Films.  He represents many past NFL players in concussion-related cases.

Stein also dabbled in commercial acting in 2009, portraying Johnson in a 30-second television spot for the national printing company DocuCopies. Stein appeared alongside former NBA player John Thomas, who portrayed The Boss.

He was selected by Sports Business Journal in 2019 as one of the 100 Most Accomplished Former NFL Players in the 100 Years of NFL edition.

In 2020, Bob was selected to the National Football Foundation College Football Hall of Fame.

See also
 Other American Football League players

Notes and references

1948 births
Living people
American football linebackers
Minnesota Golden Gophers football players
Kansas City Chiefs players
Los Angeles Rams players
Minnesota Vikings players
San Diego Chargers players
Minnesota Timberwolves executives
National Basketball Association team presidents
Jewish American sportspeople
Players of American football from Minneapolis
American Football League players
21st-century American Jews